Heimir Guðjónsson (born 3 April 1969) is an Icelandic football manager and a former player. As a player, he was deployed in midfield and represented the Iceland national team. As a manager, he won the Icelandic championship five times with Fimleikafélag Hafnarfjarðar.

Playing career
Heimir played his first senior game as a member of Knattspyrnufélag Reykjavíkur in 1986. He won the Icelandic championship as a member of FH in 2004 and 2005.

Managerial career
Heimir was hired as an assistant manager to FH on 21 September 2005. On 10 October 2007, he took over as manager of FH after Ólafur Jóhannesson resigned and won the Icelandic championship in 2008 and 2009. He won the Icelandic Cup in 2010 and the Icelandic championship again in 2012, 2015 and 2016. For his first nine seasons at the helm, FH finished either first or second in the Úrvalsdeild karla. He was sacked following the 2017 season after the team finished third in the league.

In November 2017, Heimir was hired as the manager of Havnar Bóltfelag. On 23 September he won the Faroe Islands Premier League with HB after defeating second placed KÍ 2–1. With the victory, no team could catch HB even with four matches remaining. After the season he was named the Faroe Islands Coach of the Year. In 2019, he led HB to victory in the Faroese Super Cup and the Faroese Cup.

In 2019, he took over as the manager of Valur and led them to the 2020 championship. In July 2022, he was fired as manager after a rough start of the season.

Managerial statistics

Honours and achievements

Player

Club
FH
Icelandic Champion: 2004, 2005
Icelandic League Cups: 2002, 2004
Icelandic Super Cup: 2004
1. deild karla: 2000

KA
Icelandic Super Cup: 1990

KR
Icelandic Cup: 1994, 1995

Manager

Club
FH
Icelandic Champion: 20061, 2008, 2009, 2012, 2015, 2016
Icelandic Cup: 20071, 2010
Icelandic League Cups: 20061, 20071, 2009, 2014
Icelandic Super Cup: 20061, 2008, 2009, 2010, 2013
1 Assistant manager

Havnar Bóltfelag
Faroese Champion: 2018
Faroe Islands Coach of the Year: 2018
Faroe Islands Super Cup: 2019
Faroe Islands Cup: 2019

Valur
Icelandic Champion: 2020

See also
List of Iceland international footballers

References

External links

Gudjonsson, Heimir
Gudjonsson, Heimir
Gudjonsson, Heimir
Icelandic footballers
Iceland international footballers
Icelandic male footballers
Úrvalsdeild karla (football) players
Úrvalsdeild karla (football) managers
Icelandic football managers
Knattspyrnufélag Reykjavíkur players